Brad Gilbert was the defending champion, but lost in the first round to Gary Muller.

Andre Agassi won the title by defeating Todd Witsken 6–1, 6–3 in the final.

Seeds

Draw

Finals

Top half

Bottom half

References

External links
 Official results archive (ATP)
 Official results archive (ITF)

Singles